Les Presses de l'Université du Québec (PUQ) is a university press founded in 1969 and associated with the University of Quebec. The press issues publications in over 80 disciplines, of which the principle ones are management science, political science, applied science, educational science, the social sciences, psychology, communication, ethics, arts, geography and tourism. Les Presses de l'Université du Québec is a member of the Association of Canadian University Presses.

See also

 List of university presses

References

External links 
Les Presses de l'Université du Québec

Presses de l'Université du Quebec
University presses of Canada